Ervália is a Brazilian municipality located in the state of Minas Gerais.

See also
 List of municipalities in Minas Gerais

References

Municipalities in Minas Gerais